Madison County is located in the north central portion of the U.S. state of Alabama. As of the 2020 Census, the population was 388,153, making it the third-most populous county in Alabama. Its county seat is Huntsville. Since the mid-20th century it has become an area of defense and space research and industry. 

The county is named in honor of James Madison, fourth President of the United States and the first President to visit the state of Alabama. Madison County covers parts of the former Decatur County. Madison County is included in the Huntsville, Alabama Metropolitan Statistical Area.

History
Madison County was established on December 13, 1808, by the governor of the Mississippi Territory. It is recognized as the "birthplace" of the state of Alabama, which was admitted to the Union on December 14, 1819. Huntsville was designated as the first capital of the new state. 

For much of the county's history, its economy was based on agriculture, particularly cotton plantations, which were established across the uplands. These plantations and their owners' profits were dependent on the labor of enslaved African Americans before the Civil War. Madison County was one of the largest cotton-producing counties in the state. 

Cotton remained important after the war. Most labor for cultivation was still provided by African Americans, but they worked as sharecroppers and tenant farmers. By the late 19th century, textile mills had been established around the county; they were restricted to white workers by the Jim Crow practices of racial segregation. During the early 20th century, the economy continued to be largely agricultural, although textile mills expanded their production.

During World War II, the Army established Redstone Arsenal here as a chemical weapon manufacturing site, and the county attracted related industries. After the war, it became a center of new weapon and rocket development. In 1950, a group of exiled German rocket scientists, led by Wernher von Braun, came to Redstone Arsenal from Fort Bliss, Texas in order to conduct research and development of new types of rockets.

By the 1960s, research expanded to rockets for space exploration. The Redstone rocket was modified to launch the first two Americans into space. The US began to emphasize investment in the Space Race, in order to compete with the Soviet Union during the Cold War years and to increase scientific gains. This work in the defense and space industries has generated tens of thousands of jobs in the area, most of them private contractors working in these fields. The population of Madison County has risen from 72,903 in 1950 to an estimated 395,211 in 2021.

Geography

The topography in the southern and eastern portions of the county is dominated by the dissected remnants of the Cumberland Plateau, such as Keel Mountain, Monte Sano Mountain and Green Mountain.  The northern and western portions of the county are flatter.

Rivers
Tennessee River
Flint River
Paint Rock River

Adjacent counties

Lincoln County, Tennessee (north)
Franklin County, Tennessee (northeast)
Jackson County (east)
Marshall County (southeast)
Morgan County (southwest)
Limestone County (west)

National protected area
 Wheeler National Wildlife Refuge (part)

Demographics

2000
As of the census of 2000, there were 276,700 people, 109,955 households, and 75,319 families residing in the county. There were 120,288 housing units at an average density of 149 per square mile (58/km2). The racial makeup of the county was 72.06% White, 22.78% Black or African American, 0.77% Native American, 1.86% Asian, 0.06% Pacific Islander, 0.59% from other races, and 1.89% from two or more races. Nearly 1.91% of the population were Hispanic or Latino of any race.

According to the 2000 census, the largest ancestry groups in Madison County were English 50.2%, African 22.78%, Scots-Irish 8.71%, Irish 4.3%, Scottish 4.12%, and Welsh 2.9%

2010
According to the 2010 U.S. Census:

65.9  White(non-Hispanic)
24.6% Black
0.8% Native American
2.5% Asian
0.0% Native Hawaiian or Pacific Islander
2.3% Two or more races
4.7% Hispanic or Latino (of any race)

There were 109,955 households, out of which 33.00% had children under the age of 18 living with them; 53.40% were married couples living together, 11.80% had a female householder with no husband present, and 31.50% were non-families. Nearly 27.20% of all households were made up of individuals, and 7.40% had someone living alone who was 65 years of age or older.  The average household size was 2.45, and the average family size was 3.00.

In the county, the population was spread out, with 25.60% under the age of 18, 9.40% from 18 to 24, 31.50% from 25 to 44, 22.70% from 45 to 64, and 10.80% who were 65 years of age or older.  The median age was 36 years. For every 100 females, there were 95.30 males.  For every 100 females age 18 and over, there were 92.10 males.

The median income for a household in the county was $44,704, and the median income for a family was $54,360. Males had a median income of $40,779 versus $26,534 for females. The per capita income for the county was $23,091.  About 8.10% of families and 10.50% of the population were below the poverty line, including 14.10% of those under age 18 and 9.60% of those age 65 or over.

2020

As of the 2020 United States census, there were 388,153 people, 155,878 households, and 102,575 families residing in the county.

Communities

Cities
Huntsville (county seat; partly in Limestone County and partly in Morgan County)
Madison (partly in Limestone County)	
New Hope
Owens Cross Roads

Towns
Gurley
Triana

Census-designated places
 Harvest
 Hazel Green
 Meridianville
 Moores Mill
 New Market
 Redstone Arsenal

Unincorporated communities

 Big Cove
 Brownsboro
 Chase
 Hobbs Island
 Maysville
 Monrovia
 Moontown
 Plevna
 Rainbow
 Ryland
 Toney

Education
The Madison County School System runs public schools throughout the unincorporated areas of the county and the incorporated and unincorporated communities of: Gurley, Harvest, Hazel Green, Meridianville, Moores Mill, New Hope, Owens Cross Roads, New Market, Redstone Arsenal, Triana. It also includes a few parcels of Huntsville. The system also includes Toney and Monrovia. The system runs 14 elementary schools, 4 middle schools, 5 high schools and a ninth grade school, and a career/technical center.

High schools in the Madison County School System are:

 Buckhorn High School (New Market)
 Hazel Green High School
 Madison County High School (Gurley)
 New Hope High School
 Sparkman High School (Harvest)

There are a number of private schools serving Madison County.  These include Randolph School, Madison Academy, Westminster Christian Academy, Faith Christian Academy, and several others.

Madison City and the vast majority of Huntsville both have their own separate school systems (Madison City School District and Huntsville City School District).

Transportation

Major highways
 Interstate 565
 U.S. Highway 72 (University Drive in Huntsville city limits)
 U.S. Highway 231 (Memorial Parkway in Huntsville city limits)
 U.S. Highway 431 (Governors Drive in Medical District of Huntsville; Memorial Parkway for rest of length in Huntsville City Limits)
 State Route 53 (Jordan Lane in much of Huntsville city limits)
 State Route 255 (Research Park Boulevard)

Rail
Norfolk Southern Railway
Huntsville and Madison County Railroad Authority

Air travel
The Port of Huntsville provides both passenger air service, via Huntsville International Airport which allows access to most of the rest of the United States, and shipping air service, via the International Intermodal Center. There are also three smaller public airports in the county: Hazel Green Airport, Madison County Executive Airport, and Moontown Airport.

Bicycle routes 
There are several bicycle routes in the city of Huntsville. Madison County has a master plan to develop a 70-mile bicycle and walking trail.

Politics
Madison County was formerly an overwhelmingly Democratic county as with most of the rest of Alabama, with only a narrow loss by Al Smith in 1928 due to Prohibitionist anti-Catholicism disrupting this trend until the 1960s. Even in 1964, the county nearly voted against Barry Goldwater due to its opposition to the Arizona Senator’s privatization plans for the Tennessee Valley Authority. However, since that time, the county has become solidly Republican, with the only national Democratic nominee to carry the county since 1960 being Deep South native Jimmy Carter in 1976. In the 2016 election, Gary Johnson had his best showing in the state, carrying 4.05 percent of the vote. The county is trending less Republican recently, 58.9% in 2004, 56.9% in 2008, 54.8% in 2016, and in 2020 the Republican margin of victory was the lowest since 1980. For Alabama counties supporting Donald Trump in 2016, it was the fourth narrowest margin, and in 2020 the third-narrowest after Conecuh and Barbour.

The governing body of the county is a commission. The commission is responsible for levying the county tax, establish, maintain, and discontinue county roads and bridges. The commission is also responsible for the county jail as well as the sheriff's department. 
The County Commission is composed of seven members. A Chairman is elected at-large by the county while each of the other six members is elected by their districts. Each commissioner serves a four-year term. In 2020, Violet Edwards made history becoming the first black woman to be elected to the Madison County Commission.

Places of interest
Madison County is home to Monte Sano State Park, the U.S. Space & Rocket Center, and part of the Flint River. It also contains Hampton Cove Golf Course, part of the Robert Trent Jones Golf Trail. There is a historical marker for Lincoln School and Village which were incorporated into Huntsville in 1956.

See also
National Register of Historic Places listings in Huntsville, Alabama
National Register of Historic Places listings in Madison County, Alabama
Properties on the Alabama Register of Landmarks and Heritage in Madison County, Alabama
Redstone Arsenal cemeteries

References

External links

Madison County web site
Madison County Schools 
Madison Alabama Chamber of Commerce
Madison County map of roads/towns (map © 2007 Univ. of Alabama).
 Margaret Rieder Collection, The University of Alabama in Huntsville Archives and Special Collections Historian's collection of research and documents on Madison County history.

 

 
Huntsville-Decatur, AL Combined Statistical Area
1808 establishments in Mississippi Territory
Populated places established in 1808
Counties of Appalachia